Alfred Island is an uninhabited, irregularly shaped island located in Nunavut's Qikiqtaaluk Region within the northern Canadian Arctic.

References

External links 
 Alfred Island in the Atlas of Canada - Toporama; Natural Resources Canada

Uninhabited islands of Qikiqtaaluk Region